Mughan was a province of the Abbasid Caliphate, in present-day Iranian Azerbaijan. The capital was Bajravan. Other cities were Barzand, Pilsavar, Mahmood Abad and Dezhman. Mughan State was located west of Caspian Sea and south of the Aras river, encompassing the namesake plains region.

Resources 
 

Subdivisions of the Abbasid Caliphate
Ardabil Province
Azerbaijan under the Abbasid Caliphate
History of Talysh